The Coat of Arms of Niš was designed by Dragomir Acović.
 The Coat of Arms was adopted in 1996, but officially was adopted in 2000. It has three versions.

Description

Larger Coat of Arms 
The larger coat of arms has two supporters, Stevan Sinđelić (leader of first Serbian Uprising) and Constantine the Great (Roman emperor born in Niš) holding two flags, Serbian flag with cross and four stylised letters "S" (same flag is used by Serbian Orthodox Church) and purple flag with laurel wreath and two-headed eagle. Underneath them is compartment represented by plains and motto with name of the city in Serbian, Greek and Latin representing history of the city. In the middle there is an escutcheon painted in Serbian colors (red, blue and white). In the centre of the shield there is Niš Fortress, standing beyond Nišava river. Above the fortress there is Serbian eagle similar to those on the flag held by Constantine the Great. Crest is shown as a stone crown, and over it there is a Chi Rho with Greek letters alpha and omega on the sides.

Middle Coat of Arms 
Middle coat of arms consists of a same shield, crest and motto as those of bigger coat of arms. Around shield there is a vine.

Small Coat of Arms 
Small coat of arms is just shield with eagle, Niš Fortress and Nišava river in Serbian colors (red, blue, white).

Coats of Arms of City municipalities

Niš municipality (until 2005) 
Until 2005 Niš consisted of two municipalities, Niš and Niška Banja. Municipality of Niš had its own coat of arms and flag.

City municipalities (2005–)

References 

Niš